GraphicConverter is computer software that displays and edits raster graphics files. It also converts files between different formats. For example, one can convert a GIF file to a JPEG file.

The program has a long history of supporting the Apple Macintosh platform, and at times it has been bundled with new Mac purchases.

, GraphicConverter can import about 200 file types and export 80. Images can also be retouched, edited, and transformed using tools, effects and filters. The software supports most Adobe Photoshop plug-ins, including TWAIN. The application features a batch processor, slideshow mode, image preview browser, and access to metadata comments (such as XMP, Exif, and IPTC).

Old versions that run on classic Mac OS are available for download and include a license key. These versions are no longer supported, however.

The currently supported version runs on macOS, is available as shareware,  and is maintained by LemkeSoft, a software company based in Germany.

GraphicConverter is available in a dozen languages including: English, French, German, Czech and Spanish.

See also 
 Comparison of raster graphics editors

References

External links 
 Lemke Software 
 Lemke Software 
 List of supported file formats

Classic Mac OS software
MacOS graphics software
Raster graphics editors